The Mark of the Judas is the first full-length album released by American heavy metal band Darkest Hour.  Original copies of the album are now rare and out of print, though a fully remastered reissue was eventually released through Sumerian Records on June 15, 2015.

Track listing

Personnel 
 John Henry – vocals
 Fred Ziomek - lead guitar
 Mike Schleibaum – rhythm guitar
 Billups Allen   – bass
 Ryan Parrish – drums

References 

2000 debut albums
Southern Lord Records albums
Darkest Hour (band) albums